Phalaenopsis buyssoniana is a species of orchid native to Thailand and Vietnam.

Description
It is a robust terrestrial, lithophyte with oblong-elliptic to elliptic-obovate, silvery green leaves up to 25 cm in length and 9.5 cm in width. The surface is finely spotted in purple. Rose-pink flowers are produced on erect racemes.
This species has been found to be tetraploid with a chromosome count of 76 chromosomes (2n = 2x = 76). It similar in appearance to Phalaenopsis pulcherrima, but it has larger flowers, larger leaves and longer inflorescences. These attractive features creates a high demand of the species. Problems with fruit set may arise in the creation of interspecific hybrids.

Etymology
The specific epithet buyssoniana honours the french botanist François-Charles, comte du Buysson (1825-1906).

Conservation
The IUCN has not assessed this species conservation status. It is however protected unter the CITES appendix II regulations of international trade.

References

buyssoniana
Orchids of Thailand
Orchids of Vietnam
Flora of Thailand
Flora of Vietnam
Plants described in 1888
Lithophytic orchids